Riley Baugus is an American old-time guitarist, banjo player, fiddler, singer and instrument builder from North Carolina.

Early life

Baugus grew up in the Regular Baptist tradition, which gave him a solid foundation in unaccompanied singing.  He began playing the fiddle at age 10 and grew up with the fiddler Kirk Sutphin. As a youth, he also had the opportunity to study with old-time musicians from Surry County, North Carolina and Grayson County, Virginia, including Tommy Jarrell, Robert Sykes, Dix Freeman, Verlin Clifton, and Paul Sutphin. He is influenced particularly by the Round Peak style of Surry County, North Carolina.

Career

Baugus worked as a welder and blacksmith for 18 years before becoming a professional musician. He has performed throughout the United States, as well as in Canada, Ireland, Scotland, and England. He has played with several old-time string bands, including The Farmer's Daughters, The Konnarock Critters, The Red Hots, Backstep, and the Old Hollow Stringband. He tours regularly with Dirk Powell and Tim O'Brien, and frequently performs and tours with the dancer Ira Bernstein, with the duo show Appalachian Roots. He often performs as a guest musician with the Dirk Powell Band and the North Carolina folk band Polecat Creek. He sang on the soundtrack to the 2003 film Cold Mountain. He has recorded with Robert Plant, Alison Krauss, Willie Nelson, Dirk Powell, and Martha Scanlan. He has taught banjo at the Augusta Heritage Center's Old Time Week in Elkins, West Virginia and at the Midwest Banjo Camp, in Olivet, Michigan.

Baugus released his first album, Life of Riley, in 2001.  A second album, Long Steel Rail, was released in 2006.

He lives in Walkertown, North Carolina.

Discography

Albums
{| class="wikitable"
! Year
! Album
|-
| 2001
| Life Of Riley  (Yodel Ay Hee)
|-
| 2006
| Long Steel Rail (Sugar Hill)
|-
| 2019
| Little Black Train's a Comin''' (Old Garden Records)
|}

Collaborations

Other appearances

References

External links
Riley Baugus official site
Appalachian Roots
[ Allmusic entry]

Listening
"Banjo Master Baugus Looks to Old Times", by Noah Adams, from Weekend Edition Saturday, September 1, 2007
"Riley Baugus on Mountain Stage", from Mountain Stage'', August, 2009

Singers from North Carolina
Appalachian old-time fiddlers
American banjoists
American folk singers
American folk guitarists
Old-time musicians
Baptists from North Carolina
1960s births
People from Forsyth County, North Carolina
American acoustic guitarists
American male guitarists
Living people
Guitarists from North Carolina
20th-century American guitarists
20th-century American male musicians